Frederick Roe may refer to:
 Fred Roe (polo), American polo player
 Fred Roe, English painter
 Sir Frederick Adair Roe, 1st Baronet, British barrister and magistrate